David Rangl (born March 23, 1988) is a Czech professional ice hockey defenceman. He played with HC Oceláři Třinec in the Czech Extraliga during the 2008–09 Czech Extraliga season.

References

External links

1988 births
Czech ice hockey defencemen
HC Oceláři Třinec players
Living people
Ice hockey people from Brno
SK Horácká Slavia Třebíč players
Orli Znojmo players
HC Havířov players